, known professionally as Brian Tee, is an American film and television actor. He is known for playing Dr. Ethan Choi on the NBC medical drama Chicago Med and its spin-offs from 2015 to 2022, and has starred in such films as The Fast and the Furious: Tokyo Drift (2006), The Wolverine (2013), Jurassic World (2015), and Teenage Mutant Ninja Turtles: Out of the Shadows (2016).

Early life and education
Tee was born Jae-Beom Takata (Japanese: 高田 ジェボム, Korean Hangul: 재범 타카다) in Okinawa Prefecture. His father was Japanese-American and his mother was from South Korea. His father was born in an internment camp during World War II. His mother was living in Japan working as a reporter.

At the age of two, he moved to Hacienda Heights, California, and was raised in Southern California. He attended Glen A. Wilson High School where he was an Associated Student Body president and captain of the football team. While in high school, he worked at Blackjack Pizza in Hacienda Heights.

Tee graduated from University of California, Berkeley with a degree in theater and performing arts. Not long after graduating, he adopted his "culturally ambiguous" stage name Brian Tee after being rejected by a Korean director at an audition for having a Japanese last name.

Career
Tee played Kazu, the owner of Sushi Rox, on Nickelodeon's Zoey 101. He played Eddie Choi in Crash. He starred as Akira Kimura on Grimm and Takeda on Burn Notice. He appeared in the season 4 episode "The Girl in the Mask" as Ken Nakamura on the series Bones. He played Dwayne Archimedes in the indie Feature film Roswell FM. Tee appeared in an episode in the first season of the television series Dark Blue as a Korean criminal. He had a short part in Austin Powers in Goldmember as a pedestrian ("Run! It's Goldzilla!"; "Still we should run like it is Godzilla!"). Brian can also be seen as a contestant on an episode of Hollywood Squares hosted by Tom Bergeron.  He played in 1999 against a woman named Heidi.

Tee was also in the music video "Dance Like Michael Jackson" by Far East Movement.

In James Mangold's The Wolverine (2013), starring Hugh Jackman, Tee played Noburo Mori, a sadistic minister of justice arranged to marry the daughter of Yakuza Boss Shingen Yashida (Hiroyuki Sanada).

Tee took on the role of Liu Kang in the YouTube series Mortal Kombat Legacy.

One of Tee's most famous roles was as "D.K." Takashi "Drift King" in the 3rd installment of the Fast & Furious series The Fast and the Furious: Tokyo Drift (2006).

Tee appeared in the Television film The Gabby Douglas Story on October 18, 2013, where he played her coach Liang Chow, which aired in 2014 on Lifetime.

Tee co-starred in the 2015 film Jurassic World where he played Hamada, a high-ranking commander who works for the Asset Containment Unit (ACU).

Tee played Shredder in Teenage Mutant Ninja Turtles: Out of the Shadows, the 2016 sequel to Teenage Mutant Ninja Turtles where the role was previously portrayed by Tohoru Masamune.

On July 20, 2015, Tee signed on to co-star in the NBC medical drama Chicago Med as Dr. Ethan Choi. He had previously appeared on its sister show Chicago P.D. as a Chinese gangster in season 2. In October 2022, it was confirmed that Tee would be exiting Chicago Med after 8 seasons.

Personal life
Besides English, Tee speaks fluent Japanese and proficient Korean. He is married to actress Mirelly Taylor and has a daughter named Madelyn Skyler Takata, born in 2015.

Filmography

Film

Television

Web

Video games

Music videos

References

External links 
 
 Official Myspace Page
 

1977 births
Living people
20th-century American male actors
21st-century American male actors
American male actors of Japanese descent
American male actors of Korean descent
American male film actors
American male television actors
American male voice actors
Japanese emigrants to the United States
Male actors from Los Angeles County, California
People from Hacienda Heights, California
People from Okinawa Prefecture
University of California, Berkeley alumni